Victor Edwin French (December 4, 1934 – June 15, 1989) was an American actor and director. He is remembered for roles on the television programs Gunsmoke, Little House on the Prairie, Highway to Heaven, and Carter Country.

Early career 
French was born in Santa Barbara, California, to an Armenian mother, Nellie Louise Cowles, and Ted French, an actor and stuntman who appeared in Westerns in the 1940s. French later appeared with his father in one episode of Gunsmoke, "Prime of Life", and another episode, "The Wishbone", where he was credited as "Victor Frence", both in 1966. Ted French died in 1978.

French appeared in the war film The Quick and the Dead (1963), which was produced by the theatre arts department of Los Angeles Valley College in Van Nuys, which Victor French attended. Also in 1963, he appeared as one of the "Spencer brothers" in the movie that was a forerunner of the television series The Waltons titled Spencer's Mountain starring Henry Fonda and Maureen O'Hara. Both the movie and the series were based upon the same novel by Earl Hamner Jr.

Like his father, French began his television career as a stuntman in mostly Westerns and anthology shows. He guest-starred in 39 television series. Though he had an uncredited role as an office clerk in the film The Magnificent Seven, French's first real Western role was the 1961 episode "The Noose" of the syndicated series Two Faces West. French was cast as Larrimore in the episode "Fargo" on the ABC/Warner Bros. Western series The Dakotas.

French appeared a record 23 times on Gunsmoke, often playing a dangerous or bumbling crook. On October 25, 1971, he portrayed cold-hearted robber and murderer Trafton. French guest-starred in another episode, "Matt's Love Story".

French appeared on The Waltons a year later. In "The Fulfillment", French plays blacksmith Curtis Norton, whose wife could not have children and subsequently adopts an eight-year-old orphan boy who has come to spend the week on Walton's Mountain.

This led to his being cast in his most well-known role as Mr. Edwards in Little House on the Prairie, beginning in 1974.

In other work, French starred opposite Elvis Presley in the 1969 Western, Charro!, and played the recurring character Agent 44 in the NBC series Get Smart in 1965–1966, where he portrayed an undercover spy who showed up in the worst, most unlikely of places (such as a mailbox or a porthole in a boat), and appeared in a few episodes of Bonanza, with Michael Landon. Shortly before being teamed up once again, French made a guest appearance on Kung Fu as a corrupt, bigoted sheriff in 1973. French also guest-starred in episode 24 ("Trial by Fury") of season two of Mission: Impossible, in which he played the informer in a prison.  Continuing in that corrupt mode, in 1974 on Gunsmoke, he played the part of “Sheriff Bo Harker”, a ruthless & murderous town sheriff in “The Tarnished Badge” (S20E9).

In 1976, French appeared in an episode of the Western series Sara. In 1982, he appeared in the film An Officer and a Gentleman as the stepfather of protagonist Paula Pokrifki, played by Debra Winger.

Work with Michael Landon
French is most widely known for costarring with Michael Landon on two television series. He appeared on Little House on the Prairie (1974–1977, 1981–1984) as Isaiah Edwards (French also directed some episodes of the show). He appeared on Highway to Heaven (1984–1989) as Mark Gordon.

From 1977–79, he left Little House on the Prairie to star as a small-town Georgia police chief in Carter Country. When the series ended, the actor was surprised that Landon was agreeable to his returning to the character of Mr. Edwards. French appeared in episode eight of season six and episode eight of season eight, then returned full-time, starting with episode 19 of season eight.

According to interviews with Cindy Landon, and Kent and Susan McCray on the A&E DVD release of Highway to Heaven, season three, French and Michael Landon were "crazy about each other", indicating that they always made each other laugh and enjoyed each other's company. Cindy Landon mentions that French was a quiet and reclusive kind of guy as opposed to Landon's outgoing personality.

Death
French died at the age of 54 on June 15, 1989, at Sherman Oaks Community Hospital in Los Angeles, California, three months after being diagnosed with lung cancer.

He is survived by three children with his first wife, Judith: son, Victor Edwin Jr.; twin daughters, Kelly and Tracy.

In 1989, French was inducted into the Western Performers Hall of Fame at the National Cowboy & Western Heritage Museum in Oklahoma City.

Filmography

Film

Television

Director (film and television)
Little House on the Prairie - 18 episodes (1974–1983)
Gunsmoke - 5 episodes (1974–1975)
Buck Rogers in the 25th Century - episode - The Satyr (1981)
Dallas - episode - Denial (1982)
Little House: Look Back to Yesterday - TV movie (1983)
Little House: Bless All the Dear Children - TV movie (1984)
Highway to Heaven - 12 episodes (1984–1986)
Rock-a-Doodle - co-director (live action segments) (1991)

References

External links

WouldYouBelieve.com
About Victor French

1934 births
1989 deaths
20th-century American male actors
American male television actors
American people of Armenian descent
Male actors from Santa Barbara, California
Deaths from lung cancer in California
American directors
American male film actors
Western (genre) television actors